Ryan Rottman (born March 17, 1984) is an American actor. He is known for his role as Joey Colvin on the TeenNick series Gigantic.

Rottman graduated from Lufkin High School and later attended Texas Tech University. Rottman started his career in 2008 as an extra in the comedy film The House Bunny. Before that he starred in plays at Texas Tech University. In 2009, he appeared in films Stuntmen and The Open Road. Rottman's other television credits include Greek, Victorious, 90210, and the web series Valley Peaks. He played Jordan Lyle in the second season of the ABC Family series The Lying Game in 2013.

Filmography

References

External links
 

1984 births
21st-century American male actors
American male film actors
American male television actors
Living people
Male actors from Louisiana